Desmond John Bowen (born 11 January 1949) is a British public servant, notable for serving as Director-General of Operational Policy in the Ministry of Defence during the build-up to the Iraq War.

Biography
Bowen served as an officer in the Parachute Regiment between in Northern Ireland, Cyprus and West Germany. He served as Director-General of Operational Policy in the Ministry of Defence. He served as a witness in the Iraq Inquiry. In 2017, he was appointed as a board member at the Imperial War Museum. He is an Associate Fellow at the International Institute for Strategic Studies.

Bowen is married and has two children.

References

1949 births
Living people
British civil servants
Place of birth missing (living people)